Lindsay Collins (born 17 April 1996) is an Australian professional rugby league footballer who plays as a  for the Sydney Roosters in the NRL and Australia at international level.

Collins debuted for Queensland in the 2020 State of Origin, playing all three games before winning the series. Finishing game three with the most metres by any player on the field with 148 to go with an offload and seven tackles without a miss.

Background
Collins was born in Brisbane, Queensland, Australia.

He played his junior rugby league for the Brisbane Brothers, before being signed by the Brisbane Broncos.

Collins is the grandson of Australian international Lionel Williamson.

Playing career

Early career
From 2014 to 2016, Collins played for the Brisbane Broncos' NYC team. In July 2015, he played for the Queensland under-20s team against the New South Wales under-20s team.

2017
In 2017, Collins joined the Sydney Roosters. In round 12 of the 2017 NRL season, he made his NRL debut for the Roosters against the Canberra Raiders.

2018

Collins made 8 appearances for Easts in 2018 including the week one finals victory over Cronulla and the preliminary final victory over Souths but was not included in the victorious grand final side which defeated Melbourne 21-6.

2019
Collins played 14 games for the Sydney Roosters in the 2019 NRL season.   He played in the preliminary final victory over Melbourne but was not selected to play in the 2019 NRL Grand Final which the club won over Canberra.

2020
Collins played 19 games for the club in the 2020 NRL season.  The club fell short of a third straight premiership losing to Canberra in the elimination final.

Collins's form at the Sydney Roosters was rewarded with an Origin debut for Queensland, where Collins played all 3 games off the bench in a series where Queensland won 2-1.

2021
In round 8 of the 2021 NRL season, Collins was taken from the field in the Sydney Roosters 38-4 victory over Newcastle with a suspected ACL injury.

2022
Collins made 16 appearances for the Sydney Roosters in the 2022 NRL season as the club finished sixth on the table. Collins did not play in the clubs elimination final loss to South Sydney.

In October he was named in the Australia squad for the 2021 Rugby League World Cup.

References

External links

Sydney Roosters profile
Roosters profile

1996 births
Living people
Australia national rugby league team players
Australian rugby league players
Sydney Roosters players
Queensland Rugby League State of Origin players
Rugby league props
Rugby league players from Brisbane
Wyong Roos players